is a Japanese professional tennis player.

Uchida has a career high ATP singles ranking of No. 155 achieved on 3 October 2022. He also has a career high ATP doubles ranking of No. 159 also achieved on 28 November 2022.

Uchida has won 2 Challengers and reached 14 ITF Futures singles finals, where he won the title on 8 occasions. He won his first career ATP Challenger Tour singles title in December 2021 in Rio De Janeiro, Brazil where he defeated Nicolás Álvarez Varona of Spain. Additionally, he has reached 3 Challenger doubles finals and 17 ITF Futures finals, and won the title 11 times.

Career

2022: ATP debut and first win
He made his ATP debut at the 2022 Los Cabos Open as a qualifier.

Having received a wildcard, he recorded his first ATP win at the Korea Open defeating wildcard Hong Seong-chan.

National Representation

Davis Cup
In March 2021, Uchida made his debut in the Davis Cup where he represented team Japan on grass courts against team Pakistan. He won the only match that he played, in singles, against Aisam Qureshi in straight sets 6–4, 7–6(7–4). He was meant to play an additional singles match but it became a dead rubber as the match's result wouldn't have changed the outcome of the tie.

ATP Challenger and ITF Futures/World Tennis Tour finals

Singles: 16 (10–6)

Doubles: 21 (12–9)

References

External links

1994 births
Living people
Japanese male tennis players
Sportspeople from Osaka Prefecture
People from Katano
21st-century Japanese people